Stephen John Keynes  (19 October 1927 – 13 August 2017) was a great-grandson of Charles Darwin, and chairman of the Charles Darwin Trust.

He was educated at The Hall School, Hampstead, Oundle School, and the University of Cambridge.

Keynes was the fourth son of Geoffrey Keynes and his wife Margaret Darwin, daughter of Sir George Darwin; he was also a nephew of the economist John Maynard Keynes. His brothers were Richard, Quentin and Milo. In 1955 he married Mary Cecilia Knatchbull-Hugessen, daughter of the Canadian senator Adrian Knatchbull-Hugessen. They have the following children:

 Gregory Robert Edward Keynes (born 3 June 1956)
 Elizabeth Harriet Keynes (born 15 December 1957)
 Toby William Keynes (born 2 November 1959)
 Martha Paganel Keynes (born 25 April 1961)
 Zachary Edmund Keynes (born 18 October 1962)

See also
Keynes family

References

External links
The Charles Darwin Trust
Stephen Keynes: Times obituary, 16 November 2017

1927 births
2017 deaths
People educated at The Hall School, Hampstead
People educated at Oundle School
Alumni of the University of Cambridge
Stephen
Darwin–Wedgwood family
Officers of the Order of the British Empire
Fellows of the Linnean Society of London
Fellows of Darwin College, Cambridge
British bankers